Neal Lawson (born 1963) is a British political commentator and organiser.

Lawson was born in and brought up in the 1960s and '70s in Bexleyheath, South East London. He became interested in politics through his father, who was a printer in Fleet Street, and joined the Labour Party at 16. After attending Gravel Hill Primary School, BETHS Secondary School and Bexley College, he graduated from Nottingham Polytechnic (now Nottingham Trent University), before working for the Transport and General Workers Union in Bristol and, in the mid-late 1980s, with Gordon Brown helping to write speeches.

He then went to work for the late Lord Bell at Lowe Bell Political as a lobbyist before helping found a lobby and PR company LLM Communications in 1997.  He helped set up Compass in 2003, and left LLM in 2004, with the large payout allowing him to focus full time on this work.  He now serves as executive director.

Compass describes itself as "a home for those who want to build and be a part of a Good Society; one where equality, sustainability and democracy are not mere aspirations, but a living reality." It has campaigned on issues such as high pay (helping form the High Pay Centre), and against loan sharking. It now runs a major campaign for a Universal Basic Income. At the 2017 general election Compass helped form the Progressive Alliance and continues to work across all progressive parties and movements. Compass adopts a theory of transition to a good society called 45° Change, based on a report Lawson wrote in 2019.

He writes for The Guardian, the New Statesman and OpenDemocracy about equality, democracy and the future of the left, and appears on TV and radio as a political commentator. He was the author of All Consuming (Penguin, 2009), which analysed the social cost of consumerism. Lawson's writing has been heavily influenced by the late Polish Marxist sociologist Zygmunt Bauman.

Lawson is also managing editor of the quarterly progressive policy journal Renewal.  Renewal was previously the journal of the Labour Coordinating Committee, which was wound up in 1998 and briefly replaced by the Labour Renewal Network. He co-edited The Progressive Century (Palgrave, 2001). He is on the Board of the Citizens Basic Income Trust and is a Commissioner on the WBG Commission on a Gender Equal Economy.

Lawson has been described by Zygmunt Bauman as “one of the most insightful and inventive minds on the British political stage”, in the Guardian as “the most optimistic commentator in western Europe” and as the “Eeyore of the left” in the Sunday Times.

Lawson is part-time consultant at progressive communicators Jericho Chambers where he works on a global responsible tax project.

References

External links
 Neal Lawson on Twitter
 Neal Lawson at Compass
 Neal Lawson articles at The Guardian
 Neal Lawson articles at the New Statesman
 Neal Lawson articles at openDemocracy
 Neal Lawson advocating basic income on Newsnight

1963 births
Living people
British writers
Labour Party (UK) people
Alumni of Nottingham Trent University
People from Bexleyheath
People educated at Beths Grammar School